The 2001 Buffalo Bulls football team represented the University at Buffalo in the 2001 NCAA Division I-A football season. The Bulls offense scored 205 points while the defense allowed 286 points.

Schedule

References

Buffalo
Buffalo Bulls football seasons
Buffalo Bulls football